McKinsey is a variant of the Scottish surname McKenzie which, in turn, means 'son of Coinneach (son of Kenneth). Notable people with the surname include:

Beverlee McKinsey (1935–2008), American actor
Daniel McKinsey, American physicist
Dennis McKinsey (1940–2009), American writer
James O. McKinsey (1889–1937), American business consultant
J.C.C. McKinsey (1908–1953), American mathematician
Patricia McKinsey Crittenden (born 1945), developmental psychologist
Scott McKinsey (born 1959), American television director

See also
 Kinsey (disambiguation)
 Kinsey (surname)
 McKinsey (disambiguation)

References